Janni-Luca Serra (born 13 March 1998) is a German professional footballer who plays as a forward for 2. Bundesliga club Arminia Bielefeld.

Career

Early career 
Janni-Luca Serra was born in Springe, Lower Saxony, and began playing soccer in the youth teams of SG Bredenbeck-Holtensen, where he is still an honorary member. Initially playing as a defender, he moved to the youth department of Hannover 96 at the age of 10, where he trained for a total of three years, interrupted by a move to TSV Havelse. As a 16-year-old, he was signed by Bundesliga club Borussia Dortmund to play for the club's youth teams. After winning one championship with the under-17s and two with the under-19s, Serra made his debut for Borussia Dortmund II on 30 July 2017, in a home game against Rot-Weiss Essen in the Regionalliga West. During his time at Dortmund II, he also began to eventually establish himself as a striker.

During the winter break of the 2017–18 season, BVB loaned him to 2. Bundesliga club VfL Bochum, where he gained experience in professional football in twelve brief appearances.

Holstein Kiel 
For the 2018–19 season, Serra moved permanently to the 2. Bundesliga, joining newly promoted club Holstein Kiel on a three-year contract until 2021. Under coach Tim Walter, Serra became a regular starter right away, making 30 league appearances in his first season (25 of which were starting appearances). He also played in all three cup matches. He scored his first goal in professional football on 22 September 2018, with a last minute header in a 2–2 draw against his former club VfL Bochum. With a total of 11 goals, he was the team's top scorer of the season. He retained his place in the starting XI in the following season under new head coach Ole Werner, scoring a total of eight goals in 19 league games and two cup appearances until February 2020. However, a thigh injury kept him out of play until the end of the season, which Kiel finished in 11th place.

In the 2020/21 season, Serra was once again part of the first team. The striker appeared in 31 league games (25 times as starter) in which he scored 13 goals. He finished the season in third place with his team and thus qualified for the promotion playoffs, which were lost to 1. FC Köln. In the 2020–21 DFB-Pokal, he advanced to the semifinals with Kiel, where the team lost to his youth club Borussia Dortmund. Serra appeared in all five cup games, scoring three goals.

Arminia Bielefeld 
After fulfilling his contract with Holstein Kiel, Serra moved to Bundesliga club Arminia Bielefeld for the 2021–22 season. His contract is dated until June 30, 2025. On the first matchday of the season, he made his Bundesliga debut in a goalless draw against SC Freiburg. He scored his first goal in the top flight on 18 December 2021 in a 2-0 away win against RB Leipzig.

International career 
Janni Serra has made 31 appearances for four different DFB junior national teams so far, including ten for the German under-17s (with whom he finished second at the 2015 European Championship) and four for the under-19s. On 21 July 2016, he tore his ACL during a match at the 2016 UEFA European Under-19 Championship and underwent a total of four surgeries during the remainder of 2016. He made his comeback on the pitch in April 2017 in the Under-19 Bundesliga.

On 1 September 2017, Serra made his first appearance for a men's national team, playing in the German under-21 national team coached by Stefan Kuntz against Hungary.

Personal life
Serra has an older brother (Nikola) and a younger brother (Petja), both of whom are also soccer players. His late father Ralf also used to play low-level soccer and worked for the Lower Saxony Football Association as a coach.

Serra is of distant Sardinian descent.

Career statistics

References

External links

1998 births
Living people
People from Hanover Region
Footballers from Lower Saxony
German footballers
Germany youth international footballers
Germany under-21 international footballers
German people of Italian descent
Association football forwards
Borussia Dortmund II players
VfL Bochum players
Holstein Kiel players
Arminia Bielefeld players
Bundesliga players
2. Bundesliga players
Regionalliga players